The Vancouver Stealth are a lacrosse team based in Vancouver, British Columbia. The team plays in the National Lacrosse League (NLL). The 2017 season was the 18th in franchise history and the 4th season in Vancouver. The franchise previously played in Everett, Washington, San Jose, and Albany, New York.

Regular season

Final standings

Game log

Playoffs

Roster

Entry Draft
The 2016 NLL Entry Draft took place on September 26, 2016. The Stealth made the following selections:

See also
2017 NLL season

References

Vancouver
Vancouver Stealth seasons
Vancouver Stealth